Football was contested for men only at the 1995 Summer Universiade in Fukuoka, Japan.

Men's medalists

References
 Universiade football medalists on HickokSports

U
1995 Summer Universiade
Football at the Summer Universiade
1995
Universiade